Boeckman may refer to:

 Alan L. Boeckmann, American businessman
 Todd Boeckman, American football player
 Vicki Boeckman, American musician

See also
 James Von Boeckman, American politician
 Beckman (disambiguation)